Centerville is a village in Gallia County, Ohio, United States. The population was 103 at the 2010 census. It is part of the Point Pleasant, WV–OH Micropolitan Statistical Area. It is located near U.S. Route 35 near the eastern terminus of State Route 279 as the highways parallel each other for about 1/2 mile.

Name

Although the village is officially named "Centerville," it is also commonly known as "Thurman" — the name that the Board on Geographic Names ruled in favor of using to refer to the community — and as "Ridgeway."  Its official name has also been spelled "Centreville."

History
Centerville was platted in 1835. The community originally was settled chiefly by Welsh immigrants.

Geography
Centerville is located at  (38.898729, -82.445901).

Demographics

2010 census
As of the census of 2010, there were 103 people, 43 households, and 31 families living in the village. The racial makeup of the village was 98.1% White, 1.0% African American, and 1.0% from two or more races.

There were 43 households, of which 18.6% had children under the age of 18 living with them, 53.5% were married couples living together, 7.0% had a female householder with no husband present, 11.6% had a male householder with no wife present, and 27.9% were non-families. 25.6% of all households were made up of individuals, and 11.7% had someone living alone who was 65 years of age or older. The average household size was 2.40 and the average family size was 2.87.

The median age in the village was 44.3 years. 12.6% of residents were under the age of 18; 12.7% were between the ages of 18 and 24; 28.2% were from 25 to 44; 24.4% were from 45 to 64; and 22.3% were 65 years of age or older. The gender makeup of the village was 52.4% male and 47.6% female.

2000 census
As of the census of 2000, there were 134 people, 50 households, and 40 families living in the village. The population density was 1,350.8 people per square mile (517.4/km2). There were 52 housing units at an average density of 524.2 per square mile (200.8/km2). The racial makeup of the village was 96.27% White, 0.75% African American, and 2.99% from two or more races.

There were 50 households, out of which 40.0% had children under the age of 18 living with them, 68.0% were married couples living together, 6.0% had a female householder with no husband present, and 20.0% were non-families. 16.0% of all households were made up of individuals, and 8.0% had someone living alone who was 65 years of age or older. The average household size was 2.68 and the average family size was 3.03.

In the village, the population was spread out, with 27.6% under the age of 18, 9.7% from 18 to 24, 21.6% from 25 to 44, 26.9% from 45 to 64, and 14.2% who were 65 years of age or older. The median age was 37 years. For every 100 females there were 103.0 males. For every 100 females age 18 and over, there were 94.0 males.

The median income for a household in the village was $35,625, and the median income for a family was $35,938. Males had a median income of $36,250 versus $20,833 for females. The per capita income for the village was $15,169. There were 20.0% of families and 15.4% of the population living below the poverty line, including 10.9% of under eighteens and 20.0% of those over 64.

Education
Public education in the village of Centerville is provided by the Gallia County Local School District.

References

Villages in Gallia County, Ohio
Villages in Ohio